Anthony Morris (March 168223 September 1763) was a brewer, merchant, judge, assemblyman, and mayor of Philadelphia.

Morris was born in London, England, and immigrated with his family to New Jersey shortly after his birth. From the age of three, he spent his life in Philadelphia, son of Anthony Morris, Jr., one of the city's leading citizens. In 1696, the elder Anthony paid fellow brewer Henry Babcock 20 pounds (equal to £ today) to place the younger Anthony in a seven-year indentured apprenticeship. In addition to establishing the Morris Brewery as one of colonial Philadelphia's most highly regarded, Morris followed his father as a prominent member of the Religious Society of Friends in Philadelphia. From 1737, he served as an associate justice of the city court. He sat for several sessions as a member of the assembly, and like his father before him, served as mayor in 1738. He was re-elected in 1739, but chose not to serve. He was elected again in 1747, but disappeared so he didn't have to serve. He died in Philadelphia.

Morris's grandson, Samuel, was Captain of the First Troop Philadelphia City Cavalry during the American Revolutionary War, which served with distinction as General George Washington's bodyguard during 1776 and 1777.

Sources
 Stanley Baron, Brewed in America: A History of Beer and Ale in the United States (Boston: Little, Brown and Company, 1962)
Attribution

References

External links
 First Troop Philadelphia City Cavalry history

1682 births
1763 deaths
English emigrants
Mayors of Philadelphia
American Quakers
People of colonial Pennsylvania